Engina zepa is a species of sea snail, a marine gastropod mollusk in the family Pisaniidae.

Description

Distribution
This species occurs in the Indian Ocean off Madagascar.

References

 Dautzenberg, Ph. (1929). Mollusques testaces marins de Madagascar. Faune des Colonies Francaises, Tome III

Pisaniidae
Gastropods described in 1883